The agreste ("countryside") is a narrow zone of Brazil in the states of Rio Grande do Norte, Paraíba, Pernambuco, Alagoas, Sergipe and Bahia between the coastal forest zona da mata and the semiarid sertão. The agreste fades out after it reaches Rio Grande do Norte due to the break of the mountain-chain that blocks air currents from the Atlantic ocean. This barrier is what induces high rainfalls in the coastal Atlantic forest zone.

Most of the agreste is hilly, its hills becoming higher at south, except near the narrow valley of São Francisco River. This land is mostly used for mixed farming, prevailing fruits, of which melons have especial importance. Like the sertão, the agreste is frequently affected by drought, though generally with less severe effects. Only some highland regions mostly in Pernambuco, where cities like Garanhuns and Triunfo are located, are able to reach temperatures below 10 degrees Celsius for a part of the year, usually coinciding with the south-American winter.

Climate
The climate is hot and sub-humid, with rainfall in the area's principal city of Campina Grande averaging about 700 millimetres per year - ranging from less than 10 millimetres in October and November to about 120 millimetres in May and June.

See also 
History of Brazil
Brazilian literature
Drought
Agreste
Brazil Socio-Geographic Division
Sertão
Droughts
Tieta do Agreste, a Brazilian novel and film
Caatinga

References

Nonfiction
Michael H. Glantz; Currents of Change : El Niño's Impact on Climate and Society; published 1996 by Cambridge University Press. 
Michael H. Glantz (editor); Drought Follows The Plow: Cultivating Marginal Areas; published 1994 by Cambridge University Press. 
Fagan, Brian; Floods, Famines, and Emperors: El Niño and the Fate of Civilizations; published 2000 by Basic Books. 
Nicholas G. Arons; Waiting for Rain: The Politics and Poetry of Drought in Northeast Brazil; published 2004 by University of Arizona Press. 
Euclides da Cunha, Rebellion in the Backlands

Fiction
Graciliano Ramos, Vidas Secas ("Barren Lives"), novel

Brazilian literature
Northeast Region, Brazil
Climate of Brazil
Droughts